Richard Mason Rocca (born November 6, 1977) is an American born Italian retired professional basketball player who played for the Italian National Basketball Team.

Born in Evanston, Illinois, his father is of Italian descent. He stands 203 cm tall, weighs 98 kg, and he plays as a forward-center.

Club career
Rocca played collegiately at Princeton University while achieving a degree in engineering. Following his college career in 2000, he played basketball for the Trenton Shooting Stars, of the International Basketball League.

In 2001, he moved to Europe joining Aurora Jesi of the Italian LegADue. Rocca's skills developed through hard work during this span and in 2004 he moved to Naples.

In the following three years, he became an integral part of the team and an idol of the local supporters. In 2006, he was a member of the Italian Cup Championship Napoli squad that reached the Playoff semifinal (lost against Fortitudo Bologna).

In 2007, his team participated in the Euroleague and lost in the Italian Supercup match against Benetton Treviso.

In 2008, he joined Armani Jeans Milano where he helped the team make it to the second round (round of 16) in the Euroleague, and to the semi-finals of the Italian Lega A where they lost to Siena.  He continued in 2009 to play with Armani Jeans Milano.

On July 23, 2012, Rocca signed with Virtus Bologna. In July 2013, he returned to his former club Aurora Basket Jesi.

Italian League career statistics

|-
| align="left" | 2004–05
| align="left" | Napoli
| 37 || 16 || 22.8 || .559 || .000 || .557 || 7.1 || .8 || 1.5 || .1 || 10.1
|-
| align="left" | 2005–06
| align="left" | Napoli
| 42 || 2 || 22.2 ||.599|| .000 || .679 || 7.1 || .6 || 1.9 || .2 || 10.7
|-
| align="left" | 2006–07
| align="left" | Napoli
| 37 || 24 || 26.1 || .615 || .000 || .549 || 7.0 || .8 || 1.8 || .1 ||11.6
|-
| align="left" | 2007–08
| align="left" | Napoli
| 33 || 30 || 27.5 || .583 || .000 || 480 ||7.9||1.1||2.3 || .1 || 11.2
|-
| align="left" | 2008–09
| align="left" | Milano
| 40 || 11 || 13.9 || .533 ||.000|| .611 || 4.3 || .3 || 1.3 || .1 || 5.4
|-
| align="left" | 2009–10
| align="left" | Milano
| 18 || 12 || 22.6 || 590 || .000 ||.642|| 5.4 || .4 || 1.3 || .1 || 8.4
|-
| align="left" | Career
| align="left" | 
| 209 || 95 || 22.2 || .583 || .000 || .581 || 6.5 || .7 || 1.6 || .1 || 9.6

Italian national team
Rocca was a member of the Italian senior roster at World Championship in 2006.

Awards and accomplishments
 Italian Cup (2006)

Personal life
Rocca is married to his high school sweetheart and has five children. Growing up he had two dogs, Rosie and Wizzer.  He was a math teacher at Evanston Township High School and Beacon Academy, but now is the interim principal for Baker Demonstration School in Wilmette Illinois. His house was also recently attacked by a toilet paper attack targeted at his eldest daughter, Sofia. This happened on September 27th, 2022.

References

External links
 Euroleague.net Player Profile
 Basketpedya.com Player Profile

1977 births
Living people
American people of Italian descent
Basketball players from Illinois
Centers (basketball)
Evanston Township High School alumni
Italian men's basketball players
Olimpia Milano players
Sportspeople from Evanston, Illinois
Power forwards (basketball)
Princeton Tigers men's basketball players
Virtus Bologna players
Mediterranean Games gold medalists for Italy
Competitors at the 2005 Mediterranean Games
2006 FIBA World Championship players
American men's basketball players
Mediterranean Games medalists in basketball
Trenton Shooting Stars players